"Was it Worth it?" is a song by English synth-pop duo Pet Shop Boys from their first greatest hits album, Discography: The Complete Singles Collection (1991). It was released on 9 December 1991 as the album's second and final single, peaking at number 24 on the UK Singles Chart, becoming the group's first single to not reach the top 20 since they signed to Parlophone in 1984 (the second being "Numb", 15 years later). This was the main reason why the song was not included on their later hits compilation PopArt: The Hits, however it was featured on the DVD edition and Moby’s remix of the single’s b-side "Miserablism" was included on the three disc special edition.

Critical reception
Upon its release as a single, Dave Jennings of Melody Maker noted "Was It Worth It?" had "the chunkiest, most muscular music to appear on a PSB track in a long time" and added that Tennant's vocal is "so fey, even by his standards, that it threatens to evaporate at any moment". He noted the song is "genuinely, surprisingly uplifting" as Tennant sings about "the usual Pet Shop themes [of] passion, regret and compromise, [but] from an unusually positive angle", and concluded it would be "a large and welcome hit". Barbara Ellen of NME felt the song was "not their best" and "sounds profoundly like a pastiche of every other song they've done before", but noted "its floor-scorching elegance, its deadpan distortion of The Love Song, and that daffy commitment they continue to have to everything sepia-tinted and forgotten". She also praised Tennant's vocals for "getting more accomplished with every record", adding that it's "nice to hear him singing about love and liberation in unveiled terms for once". Andy Kastanas from The Charlotte Observer wrote, "The sacred cow of disco never died for these guys (as evidenced by this song) and there's plenty of violins and a "hi-NRG" beat to prove it." Joe Brown from The Washington Post declared it as "a fierce disco anthem to rival "I Will Survive"."

Track listings

UK 7-inch single R 6306
A. "Was It Worth It?" – 4:22
Engineer, mixed by Paul Wright
Guitar – Greg Bone
Percussion – Andy Duncan
Producer – Brothers in Rhythm
Programmed by Scott Davidson
Additional vocals – Carol Kenyon, Ghida de Palma, Tessa Niles

B. "Miserablism" – 4:11
Mixed by Julian Mendelsohn
Producer – Harold Faltermeyer
US 7" single S7-57696
The A-side of this single was mistakenly mastered with the non-vocal dub version.
The B-side is a label mistake and is "Miserablism" (Electro mix) – 5:38
Tracks as listed on the label:
A. "Was It Worth It?" – 5:15
B. "Miserablism" – 4:11

US 12-inch single VNR 56243
A1. "Was It Worth It?" (12") – 7:13
A2. "Was It Worth It?" (7") – 4:27
B1. "Miserablism" (Electro mix) – 5:38
B2. "Miserablism" – 4:11

US CD single E2-56244
 "Was It Worth It?" (7") – 4:27
 "Was It Worth It?" (12") – 7:13
 "Miserablism" (Electro mix) – 5:38
 Remix by Moby
 "Music for Boys" (Part 3) – 5:40
 Remix by Altern 8
 "Overture to Performance" – 6:14

UK CD single CDR 6306
 "Was It Worth It?" – 4:23
 "Miserablism" (7") – 4:12
 "Was It Worth It?" (12") – 7:13
 "Was It Worth It?" (dub) – 5:16
Remix by Dave Seaman

Personnel
Designed by Farrow/3a/Pet Shop Boys
Artwork by (dolls) Toshima Tada
Photography – Robert Shackleton
Written by Neil Tennant and Chris Lowe

Charts

References

1991 singles
Pet Shop Boys songs
1991 songs
Songs written by Chris Lowe
Songs written by Neil Tennant
LGBT-related songs
Parlophone singles